The Breaks is a 1983 novel by Richard Price. The Breaks was Price's fourth novel.

Overview
Peter Keller, a young liberal arts graduate, moves back into his father's apartment in Yonkers after failing to get into law school and quickly self-destructs.

References

1983 American novels
Novels by Richard Price (writer)
Novels set in New York (state)
Simon & Schuster books